I Dreamt I Was a Bird, the third album of British singer-songwriter Lucy Ward, was released in the United Kingdom by Betty Beetroot Records on 2 October 2015. It consists of eight original compositions by Lucy Ward and one traditional ballad  – "Lord Randall". The album's title is taken from the lyrics of one of its tracks, "Daniel and the Mermaid".

Reception

The album was critically acclaimed, receiving four-starred reviews in The Daily Telegraph, in Songwriting magazine and in Northern Sky magazine. It was awarded Album of the Year 2015 by Fatea magazine. Helen Gregory, reviewing the album for Folk Radio UK, described it as "a sterling example of all that is good about contemporary folk music in Britain today". In a review for Artree, Phil Daniels described I Dreamt I Was a Bird as "musically compelling", surpassing both her previous albums.

Songs
"Lion", commissioned by Billy Bragg for the 14-18 NOW project, is about Rifleman Robert Loveless Barker, executed, aged 21, for cowardice during the First World War. He is commemorated on the Shot at Dawn Memorial at the National Memorial Arboretum in Staffordshire.

Track listing
"Summers That We Made" (Lucy Ward), 4.00
"Ode to Whittaker Brown" (Lucy Ward), 4.52
"Creatures and Demons" (Lucy Ward), 3.29
"Lord Randall" (Roud 10; Child 12) (traditional, arranged by Lucy Ward), 4.32
"Lion" (Lucy Ward), 4.10
"Song for Lola" (lyrics: Lucy Ward; music: Lucy Ward and Stu Hanna), 4.39
"Daniel and the Mermaid" (arranged by Lucy Ward), 3.45
"Connie and Bud" (Lucy Ward), 4.54
"Return to Earth" (Lucy Ward), 2.55

Personnel
 Lucy Ward – vocals, guitar, harmonium, concertina, percussion, banjo
 Anna Esslemont – violin
 Debbie Hanna – backing vocals
 Stu Hanna – guitars, piano, Mellotron, B3 organs, violin, backing vocals
 Sam Pegg –  bass guitar
 Lukas Drinkwater – double bass
 Stephen MacLachlan – drums
 Brighouse and Rastrick Brass Band (on "Lion")

Production
I Dreamt I Was a Bird was produced by Stu Hanna from Megson, who also performs on the album, with his wife Debbie Hanna providing backing vocals. The album was engineered by Stu Hanna and Stephen MacLachlan. The photography and album art was by Elly Lucas.

References

External links
 Lucy Ward: official website

2015 albums
Lucy Ward (musician) albums